Schnapsen, Schnapser or Schnapsa is a trick-taking card game of the Bézique (Ace-Ten) family that is very popular in Bavaria and in the territories of the former Austro-Hungarian Empire and has become the national card game of Austria and Hungary. Schnapsen is both of the point-trick (individual cards in each trick are used to determine points as in Pinochle) and trick-and-draw (a new card is drawn after each trick is won) subtypes.

The game is similar to Sixty-Six (Sechsundsechzig).  Many rule variations exist, and both Schnapsen and Sixty-Six involve challenging strategy. Schnapsen has been described as "an inherently intense game that requires a lot of concentration and so isn't good for socializing, but it's a challenging game whose interest never wavers."

Etymology and origins 

The name Schnapsen is derived from schnappen, which means "to trump". By contrast, in popular tradition, the name is frequently attributed to the fact that people often played the game for drinks, particularly schnaps, in a similar way to the origin of the name Gin Rummy. An early description of the game is found in the Leipziger Frauenzimmer-Lexicon of 1715 under the name Mariage (French for "wedding"). That name is still common and there is a game that is popular today in Czechia called Mariáš.

Schnapsen or Schna[r]psen is mentioned as early as 1876 in the following 'howler' by Professor Galletti, who informed his pupils at the  Gotha Grammar School (Gymnasium Gotha) that:
Ihr denkt wohl, Geschichte ist so leicht als Schnarps? Ach, Geschichte kann man in einer Stunde lernen, aber an Schnarps muß man mehrere Jahre studiren. ("So you really think that history is as easy as Schnaps? Ach, you can learn history in an hour, but you must study Schnaps for many years." 

Early Schnapsen rules are recorded by Unger c. 1920.

Rules

Aim 
The aim of the game is to collect 66 or more card points as quickly as possible by taking tricks in order to obtain game points that total to 7.

The cards won in the tricks score card points to determine if a round is won or lost (with additional points obtained from possible marriage melds). Each deal can give a player a maximum of 3 game points. The outcome then results in game points being awarded.

Cards 

Depending on the region, Schnapsen is either played with French or Double German playing cards, also known as the William Tell pattern. For tournaments in which players from different regions meet, there are special Double German-French cards (see illustration). Schnapsen is played with a deck of 20 cards unlike Sechsundsechzig (Sixty-Six), the game it resembles, which uses 24 cards. Unlike Sechsundsechzig, the 9 is not used in Schnapsen.

In each suit there are five cards:

In Austrian German, the Manderl is the name for the Ober, and the Bauer is the name for the Unter.

Dealing 

The dealer is decided by the drawing of cards. The player who draws the higher card, deals the first round; the other player is Forehand (Vorhand). 

Dealer shuffles, cuts and deals the cards as follows: three cards are dealt to Forehand and then three to Dealer. Next, a seventh card is flipped indicating the trump suit. Finally, two cards are dealt to Forehand and two to Dealer giving each player a 5-card hand. 

The remaining nine cards (exactly half the deck) form the talon and are placed facedown across the turn-up, so that half of the latter turn-up card is visible. The suit of the turn-up becomes the trump suit, regionally called the Atout. 

In subsequent deals, the players alternate the roles of Dealer and Forehand.

Playing 

Schnapsen is a trick-taking game in which each trick consists of two cards. Forehand leads the first trick by placing a card faceup in the center of the table. At the start of the game, players do not have to follow suit or win the trick: Dealer may either head the trick with a higher card of the same card suit or a trump (which wins the trick). Alternatively, Dealer may discard a card of their choice and giving up the trick to Forehand. The player who has won the trick places the trick facedown and draws the top card from the talon. The opponent draws the next top card from the talon. After both players have brought their hands back up to five cards, the winner of the last trick leads the next trick.

The game continues in this way until the talon is used up – unless one of the players has previously announced 66 points or flips the turn-up to close the talon (see below). If the talon is used up or was closed, players must follow suit (Farbzwang) and win the trick if possible (Stichzwang) from this point onwards. That means during their turn a player must:

 Head the trick with a higher card of the same suit. 
 If unable to do so, they must discard a lower card of the same suit. 
 If both above are not possible, they must head the trick with a trump.
 Only if they are unable to do the three above, they can discard a card of their choice.

Following suit (Farbzwang) always takes precedence over winning the trick (Stichzwang): a player may not play a trump if they can follow suit. A breach of this rule is called revoking and is penalized with the immediate loss of the deal and the opponent receiving 3 points.

Going out 

If a player reaches 66 or more card points (Augen) after winning a trick or announcing a marriage (see below), he may 'go out' (ausmelden), usually by saying "I have enough" (Ich habe genug) or just "enough" (genug). A player may not go out at any other time. After this, the game ends and each player counts the card points they have amassed.

 If the opponent has not taken a single trick, the player scores 3 points.
 If the opponent has 32 card points or fewer, the player scores 2 points.
 If the opponent has 33 or more card points, the player scores one point.

If a player discovers he has fewer than 66 card points and has thus ended the deal by mistake, play stops and his opponent wins as many points as the player would have won if they had been right.

Last trick 
If neither player goes out before the last card is played, the last card must be played and the winner of the last trick is the winner of the deal, scoring one point. This rule does not apply if the talon has been closed (see below).

Marriages 

If a player holds a King and Ober (or King and Queen) of the same suit, they may meld them (ansagen, melden) when it is their turn to lead and score the following (bonus) points:

 For a trump marriage, 40 points; this is known as a Forty-er (Vierziger) or 'royal marriage'.
 For a non-trump marriage, 20 points. this is a Twenty-er (Zwanziger).

Forehand may meld a marriage at the start. (However, for the Sharp Schnapsen variant detailed below, the marriage may only be melded after the player wins their trick and not at the start.) The player who melds a marriage must play one of the 2 cards to the next trick. (However, in Sharp Schnapsen, the melding player must play the king.) 

If the player who has melded a marriage fails to take any tricks during the game, the marriage points do not count. If the marriage card is subsequently beaten on the next trick and the player takes a trick later in the deal, the points still stand.

To avoid subsequent disputes in scoring the points, it is recommended to show both the cards of the pair. 

The King-Queen pair is known in games of the Bezique family and in Poch as a marriage. This term is common and makes more sense when playing with French suited cards.

Trump Unter 

If a player is on lead and holds the Trump Unter (or Trump Jack), the player may exchange it for the trump turn-up before leading to the trick. 

Forehand may do this before the game starts. (However, in Sharp Schnapsen, the Trump Unter can only be exchanged after the first trick is played out.)

Closing the talon 

When it is his turn, if a player believes he can achieve the required 66 points without replenishing his hand from the talon, he can 'close' it. He draws the turn-up from the bottom of the talon and lays it across the top. From this point, players must follow suit and attempt to win each trick just as if the talon had been exhausted. If the player who closed the talon succeeds in collecting 66 points and claiming victory before his opponent does, he has won. The number of game points scored depends on the number of card points collected at the time the talon is closed. The tricks and marriages of the opponent at that point are counted immediately after the talon is closed. If the player who closed the talon fails to reach 66 card points, or if his opponent, beats him to it, the opponent wins:

 3 points if he had no tricks when the talon was closed, otherwise
 2 points

Bummerls and rubbers 
A Bummerl consists of several individual hands and the dealer alternates with each hand. The player who is the first to seven game points wins and their opponent records this with a large dot against their name, also called a Bummerl.

One feature of Schnapsen is counting "from seven downwards" (von Sieben herunter ); i.e. you do not count the game points already scored, but record the number of points still needed to win. Both players thus begin with seven points; if a player wins the first game with 3 game points, their point score reduces to four. Scores are either traditionally recorded on a small chalk board or with the aid of a Bummerl counter (Bummerlzähler): the seven large beads (Perlen) on the outer arch indicate the current score of the hand or Bummerl being played, while the smaller beads on the inner arch  show the number of Bummerls already played.

 If a player wins 7–0, his opponent is Schneider (Schneiderbummerl) and the loss is doubled. The loser chalks up 2 Bummerls – this rule does not apply in tournaments.
 In all other cases the loser receives one Bummerl.

A rubber (Partie) consists, either by agreement or tournament rules, of two or three Bummerls, i.e. the player who gets his opponent to chalk up two or three Bummerls, wins the rubber.

From this is derived the saying: Einer kriegt immer das Bummerl (German) / Oana kriagt imma dös bummal (Austrian) which means "Someone always gets the Bummerl", i.e. "someone always loses out".

Sharp Schnapsen 

The above rules describe the so-called 'soft'  Schnapsen. Sharp Schnapsen (Scharfes Schnapsen) has the following rule changes:
 Played tricks may not be looked at; players must count their own card points as they go
 If only one card of the talon is left on the trump turn-up a player may not close the talon and may not exchange the trump either
 Forehand may not exchange the trump turn-up before the first trick
 Players must have at least one trick before melding a pair or marriage (Zwanziger, Vierziger).
 If a player melds a pair, they must play the King to the next trick – playing the Ober or Queen is not permitted.
 Players may not draw from the talon until the previous trick has been turned over (facedown).

Tournament Schnapsen 
Schnapsen enjoys great popularity in Austria and is played at numerous tournaments. The predominant tournament type is Preisschnapsen. Less often a Swiss-system tournament is played. The winner of a match is the player who is the first to "add" 2 bummerls to his opponent's score sheet. If a game is won with a score of 7:0, this only counts as 1 bummerl in tournament play, not two as in private games. Depending on the tournament rules, either 'soft' (weich) or 'sharp' (scharf / hart) Schnapsen may be played.

Preisschnapsen 
A Preisschnapsen tournament is played to a 'modified' knockout system. This tournament form  is also used for Watten, where it is called Preiswatten. While in the usual knockout system a player is eliminated after his first defeat, this is not always the case in the case of Preisschnapsen, as a player can buy several entry cards in some tournaments.

Participant cards 
Before the start of the tournament 'participant cards' are issued, the number of cards always being a power of two - for example, 32, 64, 128 - and depending on the expected number of players. Each player may buy a certain number of entry cards - variously called Lose ("batches" or "lots"), Leben ("lives") or Standkarten ("entry cards"), up to a maximum of, say, three cards, as specified in the tournament invitation. Unsold tickets are Freilose ("byes").

Draws 
The pairings for the first round are then drawn by lots. Draws are held in such a way that a player who has several entry cards does not have to play against himself if possible. In the higher rounds, however, this may happen, in which case the player concerned must hand in one participant card and may advance to the next round with the other card.

A typical draw proceeds as follows. Assuming 64 entry cards are issued, 32 games will be played in the first round of the tournament. For the draw two pots are used - a 'right' and a 'left' pot - in each of which 32 cards with the numbers 1 to 32 are placed. Now the individual players draw, according to the number of entry cards they have bought, starting with the left pot: if the first player has bought three cards, he draws three cards from the left pot, and so on. Only when all cards have been drawn from the left pot, are cards drawn from the right pot. If the left pot is empty and the player who drew the last card from it also has to draw from the right, it is conceivable that he could draw the same number again. If so, he is allowed to re-draw from the right pot.

The numbers left in the right pot after all players have drawn their 'round numbers' are byes, i.e. the players who have drawn the corresponding numbers from the left pot move up to the next round without having to compete. The participants who have drawn the same number, now meet in the first round and play a game for, usually, 2 bummerls.

Rounds 
Of course, not all games in a round can be played at the same time, as a player who has several entry cards has to play against several opponents. There is no schedule showing when which player has to play which opponent. Each player has to track down his opponent - assisted by the tournament management team. The winner of a game keeps his entry card and moves on to the next round, the loser must hand in an entry card - but as long as he still has further entry cards, he remains in the tournament. Once all games in a round are finished, the pairings for the next round are drawn, with players who still have more than one entry card drawing first.

Prizes 
There are usually eight prizes at a Preisschnapsen tournament:

 1st prize: tournament winner
 2nd prize: finalist
 3rd and 4th prizes: the losers of the two semi-final games play for third place.
 5th to 8th prizes: the four losers of the quarter-finals meet; the winners from these matches then play for 5th and 6th places; the losers play for 7th and 8th places.

A player who purchases more than one entry card can also win more than one prize, unless the tournament conditions expressly state otherwise.

The winner of a Preisschnapsen used to receive a goose as first prize.

Legal 

According to Austrian law, Schnapsen − unlike the various poker variants − is not a game of chance used for gambling, but a game of skill, viz.:

"Typical games of skill are Tarock, Bridge, Schnapsen or chess."

Related games 
 Sechsundsechzig
 Bauernschnapsen is a variant for four players
 Dreierschnapsen is a variant for three players
 Russian Schnapsen

References

Literature 
 Babsch, Fritz (1983). Internationale und österreichische Kartenspiel-Regeln, Vienna.
 Bamberger, Johannes (2012). Schnapsen. Die schönsten Varianten, Perlen-Reihe, Vol. 639, Perlen-Reihe, Vienna o. J.
 Beck, Fritz (1961) Schnapsen (Sechsundsechzig) Preisschnapsen, Perlen-Reihe, Vol. 639, Perlen-Reihe, Vienna.
 Gugl, Helmuth (1971) Meisterschnapsen, Piatnik, Vienna.
 Tompa, Martin (2015) Winning Schnapsen: From Card Play Basics to Expert Strategy. ISBN 978-1515377368.
 Unger, Franz (c. 1920). Besigue, Schnapsen, Binokel, Pinnageln. Vienna: Mickl.

External links 

 Winning Strategy for Schnapsen or Sixty-Six
 Description at www.pagat.com

 
William Tell deck card games
Two-player card games
German deck card games
King-Queen games
South Tyrolean card games
Trick-and-draw games
Point-trick games